The 2016–17 Plunket Shield was the 88th season of official first-class cricket in New Zealand. The competition started on 22 October 2016, and ran to 1 April 2017. The round seven fixtures that started in early March 2017, were played as day/night matches. These were in preparation for a possible day/night Test match between New Zealand and England, scheduled to take place in March 2018. Despite some concerns about the visibility of the pink ball while catching, the matches received positive feedback.

In the first round of matches, Michael Papps playing for Wellington, became the first player to score 10,000 runs in the Plunket Shield. The start of the round four fixture between Wellington and Central Districts was delayed because of a 7.8 magnitude earthquake that struck New Zealand on 14 November 2016. It was later abandoned because of frequent aftershocks in the area.

Canterbury won the tournament, their 19th title in the competition, and their third win in the last four years.

Points table

 Winner

Teams

Squads
Prior to the start of the season, the following squads were announced:

Fixtures

Round 1

Round 2

Round 3

Round 4

Round 5

Round 6

Round 7

Round 8

Round 9

Round 10

References

External links
 Series home at ESPN Cricinfo

Plunket Shield
2016–17 New Zealand cricket season
Plunket Shield